Beatriz Corrales Ocaña (born 3 December 1992) is a Spanish badminton player. She was the women's singles bronze medalist at the 2015 European Games, and the silver medalist at the 2018 Mediterranean Games.

Achievements

European Games 
Women's singles

Mediterranean Games 
Women's singles

European Junior Championships 
Girls' singles

BWF Grand Prix (1 title, 1 runner-up)
The BWF Grand Prix had two levels, the Grand Prix and Grand Prix Gold. It was a series of badminton tournaments sanctioned by the Badminton World Federation (BWF) and played between 2007 and 2017.

Women's singles

  BWF Grand Prix Gold tournament
  BWF Grand Prix tournament

BWF International Challenge/Series (15 titles, 10 runners-up) 
Women's singles

Women's doubles

  BWF International Challenge tournament
  BWF International Series tournament
  BWF Future Series tournament

References

External links 
 
 

1992 births
Living people
People from Leganés
Sportspeople from the Community of Madrid
Spanish female badminton players
Badminton players at the 2015 European Games
Badminton players at the 2019 European Games
European Games bronze medalists for Spain
European Games medalists in badminton
Competitors at the 2018 Mediterranean Games
Competitors at the 2022 Mediterranean Games
Mediterranean Games silver medalists for Spain
Mediterranean Games medalists in badminton
21st-century Spanish women